Carex alsophila, commonly known as forest sedge, is a tussock-forming species of perennial sedge in the family Cyperaceae. It is native to Victoria in south eastern Australia.

The sedge has a short rhizome and tufted shoots that are densely packed together. The erect culms have a triangular cross section and can be smooth or have a rough texture.

The species was formally described by the botanist Ferdinand von Mueller in 1874 as a part of the work Fragmenta phytographiae Australiae.

It is only found in southern Victoria in the Gippsland, Highlands and Victorian Alps regions.

See also
List of Carex species

References

alsophila
Taxa named by Ferdinand von Mueller
Plants described in 1874
Flora of Victoria (Australia)